The 3 arrondissements of the Mayenne department are:
 Arrondissement of Château-Gontier, (subprefecture: Château-Gontier-sur-Mayenne) with 76 communes. The population of the arrondissement was 73,186 in 2014.
 Arrondissement of Laval, (prefecture of the Mayenne department: Laval) with 34 communes.  The population of the arrondissement was 112,482 in 2014.
 Arrondissement of Mayenne, (subprefecture: Mayenne) with 132 communes. The population of the arrondissement was 121,682 in 2014.

History

In 1800 the arrondissements of Laval, Château-Gontier and Mayenne were established. The arrondissement of Château-Gontier was disbanded in 1926, and restored in 1942. On 1 January 2019, the commune of Château-Gontier were disbanded and establish the new commune of Château-Gontier-sur-Mayenne as a subprefecture for the Arrondissement of Château-Gontier.

The borders of the arrondissements of Mayenne were modified in March 2016:
 14 communes from the arrondissement of Laval to the arrondissement of Château-Gontier
 38 communes from the arrondissement of Laval to the arrondissement of Mayenne

References

Mayenne